The 1948 Clemson Tigers football team was an American football team that represented Clemson College in the Southern Conference during the 1948 college football season. In its ninth season under head coach Frank Howard, the team compiled an 11–0 record (5–0 against conference opponents), won the Southern Conference championship, was ranked No. 11 in the final AP Poll, defeated Missouri in the 1949 Gator Bowl, and outscored all opponents by a total of 274 to 76. This team certainly claims ownership of the National Championship of College Football for the 1948 season by virtue of being the only unbeaten and untied team who also participated in post-season play in a bowl game versus Missouri.   The team played its home games at Memorial Stadium in Clemson, South Carolina. Memorial Stadium hosted its first night game in the opener against .

The team's statistical leaders included tailback Bobby Gage with 799 passing yards and wingback Ray Mathews with 646 rushing yards and 78 points scored (13 touchdowns).

Bob Martin and Phil Prince were the team captains. Guard Frank Gillespie and back Bobby Gage were selected as first-team players on the 1948 All-Southern Conference football team. Seven Clemson players were named to the All-South Carolina football team for 1948: tackle Phil Prince and Tom Salisbury; guard Frank Gillespie; center Gene Moore; and backs Bobby Gage, Ray  Mathews, and Fred Cone.

Prince would become interim president of Clemson during the 1994-95 school year.

Schedule

The Mississippi State was mentioned in Jerry Clower's Country Ham album in 1974. Clower played with Mississippi State and mentioned Cone during the comedy routine.

References

Clemson
Clemson Tigers football seasons
Southern Conference football champion seasons
Gator Bowl champion seasons
College football undefeated seasons
Clemson Tigers football